The Royal Flora Ratchaphruek was an international horticultural exposition held 1 November, 2006 to 31 January, 2007 in the Thai city Chiang Mai of Chiang Mai Province that drew 3,781,624 visitors. Recognised by the Bureau International des Expositions (BIE), it was one of the grand celebrations hosted by the Royal Thai Government in honor of King Bhumibol, the world's longest reigning monarch.

Preparation
The ratchaphruek (Cassia fistula), or golden shower tree, is the de facto national flower of Thailand. Its yellow blossoms correspond to Monday, the birthday of Bhumibol. It is also named "Khun" or "Rajapruek".

The event was located on 80 hectares of land at the Royal Agricultural Research Center in the Mae Hia sub-district, Mueang district, Chiang Mai Province in northern Thailand. The 92 days of the expo featured 30 international gardens reflecting nations such as Japan, South Korea, Belgium, Netherlands, South Africa, and Canada. More than 2.5 million trees of 2,200 species of tropical plants and flowers were on display in this exhibition. The Association of International Horticultural Producers (AIPH), gave this expo A1 status, its highest level. Such exhibitions occur only once a year throughout the world. In addition, a host country can only hold one such exhibition once a decade.

The festival
The festival included many highlights to attract tourists:

Gardens for the king There were two features in this zone: one was international gardens, which were presented by 30 participating nations and covered 21,000 square meters; the other  was corporate gardens, which covered 27,475 square meters, and were presented by both Thai state enterprises, and domestic and international major corporations.
Ho Kham Royal Pavilion This building featured Lanna architecture, the architectural style of northern Thailand; inside, visitors saw pictures of King Bhumibol's works and his dedication.
Thai Tropical Garden The enormous 100,000-square-meter garden showcased the diversity of tropical horticulture: fruit varieties, plants, flowers, herbs, and rare plants.
Expo Plaza This was the focus of the exposition's  fun-filled activities, amenities, and services. Visitors were able to purchase products from royal projects and authentic local products from Chiang Mai such as handicrafts, paper umbrellas, and souvenirs.
Cultural shows A total of 45 cultural shows from various regions of Thailand were performed, including traditional music and dance. In addition, cultural performances from other nations were presented.

The Thai government had expected an average of 20,000 visitors per day, with over 100,000 visitors on a crowded day, and 3 million visitors in total to attend the Royal Flora Ratchaphruek 2006. At the exposition's conclusion, organizers claimed that the exposition had injected 27 billion baht into the regional economy.

The Thai government has proposed transforming the site of the exposition into a permanent training center. Despite some complaints of corruption and substandard facilities, organizers believed the exposition achieved its goals of promoting tourism and developing Thai horticultural industries.

The park was open to the public in 2008 with many of the past highlights still very much in evidence, including the international exhibits. It is thought that it will remain to stay open as a valued addition to things to do in Chiang Mai. The park receives around 500 visitors a day at the moment, mainly Thai.

Gallery

References

External links

 Official website of the BIE

2006 festivals
2007 festivals
International horticultural exhibitions
World's fairs in Asia
World's fairs in Thailand
2006 in Thailand
2007 in Thailand
Festivals in Thailand
Flower festivals in Thailand
Garden festivals in Thailand
Chiang Mai province